Sipakapense  is a Mayan language, closely related to Kʼicheʼ spoken natively within indigenous Sipakapense communities in Western Guatemala. It is primarily based in the municipality of Sipacapa in the department of San Marcos.

References

Agglutinative languages
Languages of Guatemala
Mayan languages
Indigenous languages of Central America
Mesoamerican languages